WOBM can refer to:

 WOBM (AM), a radio station (1160 AM) licensed to Lakewood Township, New Jersey, United States
 WOBM-FM, a radio station (92.7 FM) licensed to Toms River, New Jersey, United States